Sicelo Moya is a South African gospel singer best known for his 2013 album Bread of Life which was nominated for South African Music Awards.

Moya was born into a musical family in Mpumalanga province, he is brother to Afrotraction and started singing in church at an early age.

Discography
Bread of Life (2013)
Solid Rock: Live at the Lyric Theatre (2017)

References

Living people
South African musicians
People from Mbombela
People from Johannesburg
Year of birth missing (living people)